Lewis "Lew" Dauber (April 27, 1949 – October 3, 2019) was an American character actor. He was best known for his frequent casting as a clergyman, appearing as such in various productions over more than two decades.

Early life and career
Although born in New York City, Dauber earned his bachelor's degree in California from the University of California, Berkeley, where he performed as building inspector Henri Cotte (Henri Paillardin in the original), in the school's 1969 production of Hotel Paradiso. After graduation, he became an employee of Citibank, where he sold traveler's checks, though he soon quit to pursue a career in show business. While he managed to land some small commercial parts, it was his appearance on a second-season episode of The Fall Guy, alongside Lee Majors and Tony Curtis, that earned him his first credited acting role.

Despite having steady work most of his career, Dauber found time to return to school later in life, earning his master's degree at Mount St. Mary's University. Following his graduation, he would return to teach in the University's department of film, media and social justice. Additionally, he served on the SAG-AFTRA credit union board of directors.

Personal life and death
On May 25, 1986, Dauber married Paulette Levin, a publicist for the Walt Disney Company whose credits also include Dodgeball: A True Underdog Story, Rent, Unaccompanied Minors and Mars Needs Moms. Together, the couple had two sons, Jeff and Zach.

Dauber died of liver cancer on October 3, 2019, in Los Angeles, California, at the age of 70, He is interred at Eden Memorial Park in Mission Hills.

Partial filmography

Film

Television

References

External links

1949 births
2019 deaths
20th-century American male actors
21st-century American male actors
American male film actors
American male television actors
Burials at Eden Memorial Park Cemetery
University of California, Berkeley alumni